Karrada ( Karrāda) is an upper-class district of the city of Baghdad, Iraq. It has a mixed population of Muslims and Christians. It is one of the most religiously diverse areas of the city, and is one of the two major districts of the Christian community in Baghdad, along with Dora. All of the Christians of the district congregate in Inner Karrada, where most of the Churches are located, with congregations of Chaldeans, Assyrians, Melkite Greeks, and Armenian Catholics. It has two sub-districts, being Nazaith and Masbah. Karrada is on the northern part of the peninsula, which was created by a sharp turn in the Tigris river. As a result, the district has much waterfront property, making it a desirable and expensive district.

Bombings 
The district of Karrada has had multiple terrorist attacks over the years, which occurred in part to the presence of its large Shia and Christian population and wealth. The area is relatively free from sectarianism otherwise, with the actual people of the district coexisting quite well. The airline Al-Naser Airlines has its head office in Karrada, in an area next to Al Jadirya Private Hospital. On 3 July 2016, an ISIL terrorist attack in the area killed 347 civilians on one of the last evenings marking the end of Ramadan.

Other districts on the peninsula
Karrada shares the peninsula with Al-Jadriya district. It is a small district which lies at the southern tip of the peninsula, where the Tigris river makes its major turn and heads to the north-east. Its significance comes from its quality of life, and its real estate is, along with Karrada, some of the most expensive in Baghdad. The design and building of the University of Baghdad Campus in 1958 also added to its value since the University has become one of the most important locations in the city, and its campus takes up the entire right half of the district. The University of Baghdad campus was designed by Walter Gropius, AIA, Louis Mcmillen and Robert McMillan of The Architects Collaborative. There is one subdistrict of the city: Babil, likely named for the Babylon hotel that has its location in the district.

See also

 Kulwatha

References

Administrative districts in Baghdad
Neighborhoods in Baghdad